"Dream of Me (Based on Love's Theme)" is a song by English electronic band Orchestral Manoeuvres in the Dark (OMD), released as the second single from their ninth studio album, Liberator (1993). The song uses a sample from "Love's Theme", a 1973 instrumental piece recorded by Barry White's Love Unlimited Orchestra. It was remixed by Gregg Jackman for release as a single and reached the top 30 in Belgium, the Netherlands, and the United Kingdom.

Billboard, in a positive review, wrote: "['Dream of Me'] is a sparkling pop bauble that will have you twirling back in time to your favorite disco memories. The tune itself is pretty and engaging, well-served by Andy McCluskey's warmly familiar voice."

Track listings
7-inch and cassette single
 "Dream of Me (Based on Love's Theme)" (7-inch remix)
 "Strange Sensations"

UK CD1 and Australasian CD single
 "Dream of Me (Based on Love's Theme)"
 "Strange Sensations"
 "The Place You Fear the Most"
 "Dream of Me (Based on Love's Theme)" (Pianoforte Cruiser mix)

UK CD2
 "Dream of Me (Based on Love's Theme)"
 "Enola Gay" (live)
 "Dreaming" (live)
 "Call My Name" (live)

Charts

References

1993 singles
1993 songs
Orchestral Manoeuvres in the Dark songs
Songs written by Andy McCluskey
Songs written by Barry White
Virgin Records singles